Bursa gas power plant is a gas-fired power station in Bursa Province western Turkey.

References

External links 

 

Natural gas-fired power stations in Turkey
Buildings and structures in Bursa Province